Anatoly Mikhailovich Sagalevich (born 5 September 1938) is a Russian explorer, who works at the Shirshov Institute of Oceanology of the Russian Academy of Sciences (USSR Academy of Sciences until 1991) since 1965.

Since 1979, he has been the director of the Russian (former Soviet) Deepwater Submersibles Laboratory. He received Doctor of Sciences degree in 1985. Sagalevich took part in the construction of Pisces VIII, Pisces IX and MIR Deep Submergence Vehicles (DSV) and completed more than 300 submersions as the chief pilot of DSVs. Between 1989 and 2005, he led 28 expeditions on MIR DSV. He was the pilot of MIR during expeditions to the British passenger liner RMS Titanic, the German battleship Bismarck, the Soviet submarine K-278 Komsomolets, the Japanese submarine I-52, and the Russian submarine K-141 Kursk.

On 2 August 2007, Sagalevich was the pilot of MIR-1 DSV, that reached the seabed at the North Pole during Arktika 2007 expedition.

On 10 January 2008, Sagalevich was awarded the title Hero of the Russian Federation for "courage and heroism showed in extremal conditions and successful completion of High-Latitude Arctic Deep-Water Expedition."

Honours and awards
 Hero of the Russian Federation (9 January 2008), "for courage and heroism displayed in extreme conditions, and the success of high-latitude Arctic deep-sea expedition."
 Order of Lenin – for MIR-1 and MIR-2 creation
 Order of the Badge of Honour – for deepwater research of Lake Baikal
 Order of Courage – for special underwater operations on Soviet submarine K-278 Komsomolets
Lowell Thomas Award – for valuable contribution into conducting deepwater ocean research in the 20th century.
 2007 Adventurer of the Year award from prestigious Los Angeles Adventurers' Club for Arctic dive to North Pole.
 2008 The William Beebe Award The Explorers Club
 2009 The Ralph White Award from The Explorers Club
 2002 – Member of the Academy of Arts and Sciences underwater U.S. category "Science"

Books

Filmography

See also 
 List of Russian inventors

References

External links
 Biography

1938 births
Living people
Russian and Soviet polar explorers
Russian explorers
Russian inventors
Russian oceanographers
Soviet oceanographers
Heroes of the Russian Federation
Recipients of the Order of Lenin
Recipients of the Order of Courage
Soviet explorers
Soviet inventors